Greenbank Airport  is located  south of Greenbank in Scugog, Regional Municipality of Durham, Ontario, Canada.

Runways
Planes land on turf in summer and on ice and snow in winter.

Facilities
Two small hangars (providing limited storage at the airfield), airport office (converted farm house) and refuelling tanks are the few structures at the airport. The airport offers either Avgas or Mogas.

Tenants

 Aviator Academy - sightseeing flights, flight training

Controversies 

The Township of Scugog filed claims of illegal dumping by GFL Environmental has resulted in nearby soil contamination from 2012 to 2015. The claim believes the numbered Ontario company is owned by GFL   and using it to transport soil from their Pickering site.

Accident 
On August 1, 2008 at around 9:45am a small plane crashed near the airport. Both people in the plane died. One was the airport owner and manager and the other is unknown. Emergency services attended the scene and left by 11am. The crash scene was near the intersection of Durham Regional Road 47 and Highway 12.

References

External links
 Greenbank Airport

Registered aerodromes in Ontario